Albertogaudrya is an extinct genus of astrapotherian mammal that lived in present-day Salta, Argentina (paleocoordinates ) during the Eocene (Casamayoran SALMA) .
Fossils of Albertogaudrya have been found in the Lumbrera and Sarmiento Formations. It is named after French palaeontologist Albert Gaudry.

Species 
A. carahuasensis differs from A. unica in having smaller premolars, with m1 having longer talonid and wider trigonid, p3-m1 with shallower external sulci and lacking cingulae, and less curved hypolophid. A. carahuasensis is known from a fragmentary mandible.

References

Bibliography 

 
 

Meridiungulata
Eocene mammals of South America
Divisaderan
Mustersan
Casamayoran
Bartonian life
Paleogene Argentina
Fossils of Argentina
Salta Basin
Fossil taxa described in 1901
Fossil taxa described in 1977
Taxa named by Florentino Ameghino
Prehistoric placental genera
Golfo San Jorge Basin
Sarmiento Formation